Thomas H. Conway (February 9, 1860 – May 1, 1940) was an American politician and businessman.

Born in Troy, New York, Conway went to public schools and to the Homer Academy in Homer, New York. He was superintendent of the construction of steel and iron bridges and buildings in the United States. He was also in the insurance business. According to his Wisconsin legislative biography, Conway took a trip on a ship from Portland, Oregon, then around Cape Horn and then to Ireland and finally to New York City. Conway settled in Milwaukee, Wisconsin and was superintendent of the building of the Milwaukee City Hall from 1893 to 1895. From 1921 to 1931, Conway served in the Wisconsin State Assembly and was a Republican. Conway said that during his time in the Wisconsin State Assembly, he never introduced any legislation. Conway died in Milwaukee, Wisconsin.

Notes

1860 births
1940 deaths
Politicians from Troy, New York
Politicians from Milwaukee
Businesspeople from Wisconsin
Republican Party members of the Wisconsin State Assembly